Lars Jilmstad (born 1946) is a Swedish politician. From January 2020 to September 2022, he served as Member of the Riksdag representing the constituency of Stockholm Municipality. He became a member after Beatrice Ask resigned. From 26 August 2019 to 31 December 2019, he served as substitute in the Riksdag for Jessica Rosencrantz.

References 

Living people
1946 births
Place of birth missing (living people)
Members of the Riksdag from the Moderate Party
Members of the Riksdag 2018–2022
21st-century Swedish politicians